Bolkestein is a surname. Notable people with the surname include:

Frits Bolkestein (born 1933), Dutch politician and intellectual
Gerrit Bolkestein (1871–1956) Dutch politician, grandfather of Frits
Martijn Bolkestein (born 1972), Dutch politician, nephew of Frits

Dutch-language surnames